Walter Alexander Montgomery (February 17, 1845 – November 26, 1921) was a Confederate soldier in the American Civil War, and later a lawyer and a justice of the North Carolina Supreme Court from 1895 to 1905.

Early life and military service
Born in Warrenton, North Carolina to Thomas Alexander and Darian Dawson Cheek Montgomery, Montgomery's father "owned many slaves" and "supported  the cause of Secession with all his heart". Montgomery enlisted during the Civil War at the age of sixteen, joining the 1st North Carolina Cavalry Regiment in 1861. He was "discharged because of physical disability" a month later, having been diagnosed by a military doctor as having consumption due to his small size and apparent frailty, but shortly thereafter traveled to Norfolk, Virginia and reenlisted with the Second North Carolina Volunteers. He achieved the rank of sergeant in 1862 and second lieutenant in 1864.

His participation in the war is described as encompassing a number of notable battles:

Legal and judicial career
After the war, which had financially ruined his family, Montgomery briefly worked as a travelling entertainer. He attended Warrenton Academy, and studied law under William Eaton, Jr., who had been Attorney General of North Carolina. Montgomery was admitted to the bar in 1867, and became county attorney for Warrenton until the office was abolished the following year. He also working as an editor for the Warrenton Courier, and starting his own newspaper, The Living Present.

He practiced in Memphis, Tennessee from 1873 to 1876, then returned from to Warrenton to practice from 1876 to 1893, when he moved to Raleigh, North Carolina, where he remained in practice until his election to a vacated seat on the Supreme Court in 1894. In 1896, he was elected for the full term of eight years, serving until January 1905, and authoring a number of well-regarded opinions. He then returned to private practice, also serving by appointment as a standing master for the United States Circuit Court for the Eastern District of North Carolina.

Personal
On September 27, 1871, Montgomery married Lizzie Holman Wilson, in Roanoke, Virginia. They had four children. Montgomery died in Raleigh and was buried in Oakwood Cemetery.

References

Justices of the North Carolina Supreme Court
1845 births
1921 deaths
Confederate States Army officers
Child soldiers in the American Civil War